Jana Novotná and Arantxa Sánchez Vicario were the defending champions and won in the final 6–4, 6–4 against Meredith McGrath and Larisa Neiland.

Seeds
Champion seeds are indicated in bold text while text in italics indicates the round in which those seeds were eliminated. All sixteen seeded teams received byes into the second round.

Draw

Finals

Top half

Section 1

Section 2

Bottom half

Section 3

Section 4

References
 1996 Lipton Championships Women's Doubles Draw

Women's Doubles
Doubles